L1210 is a mouse lymphocytic leukemia cell line which is derived from the ascitic fluid of 8-month-old female DBA/2 strain mice. While they are lymphocytic B-cells they are more like lymphoblasts in morphology, develop massive tumours in nude mice after a latent period of 7-10 days.

References

External links                                                              
Cellosaurus entry for L1210

Rodent cell lines
Lymphocytes